Haakon Ditlev Lowzow (5 October 1854 – 12 August 1915) was a Norwegian military officer and politician for the Liberal Party. He is best known as the Norwegian Minister of Defence from 1908 to 1909.

Personal life
Lowzow was born in Kristiania, and came from a military background. His father was a lieutenant, his grandfather was a major general and his great-grandfather was a lieutenant general. Also, he was a granduncle of Carl Fredrik and Wenche Lowzow.

Career
He became a military officer in 1872, and was promoted to premier lieutenant in 1887 and lieutenant colonel in 1904. On 11 April 1908, when the first cabinet Knudsen assumed office, he was appointed as the new Minister of Defence. He held this position until 19 August 1909, when he resigned. He later became major general of rank and Inspector-General of the Infantry. He died in August 1915.

References

1854 births
1915 deaths
Norwegian Army generals
Liberal Party (Norway) politicians
Military personnel from Oslo
Defence ministers of Norway